Perambalur is a town in the Indian state of Tamil Nadu. It is the headquarters of Perambalur district and Perambalur taluk (sub-district).  census, the town had a population of 49,648. 

There are a set of 11th century Buddha statues around the villages of Perambalur called Perambalur Buddhas.

Geography
It is the largest town and administrative headquarters of Perambalur district, as well as Perambalur Taluk (Sub-District).

The town covers an area of 20.59 sq.km. Though a landlocked district, fossils of marine species dated 416 million years ago were found near the Kunnam taluk of the district, revealing the fact that the land was part of the ancient sea.

Demographics

According to 2011 census, Perambalur had a population of 49,648 with a sex-ratio of 1,013 females for every 1,000 males, much above the national average of 929. A total of 5,190 were under the age of six, constituting 2,678 males and 2,512 females. Scheduled Castes and Scheduled Tribes accounted for 29.43% and 0.29% of the population respectively. The average literacy of the town was 80.77%, compared to the national average of 72.99%. The town had a total of  12,732 households. There were a total of 18,430 workers, comprising 998 cultivators, 1,746 main agricultural labourers, 364 in house hold industries, 13,762 other workers, 1,560 marginal workers, 49 marginal cultivators, 390 marginal agricultural labourers, 78 marginal workers in household industries and 1,043 other marginal workers. As per the religious census of 2011, Perambalur had 86.94% Hindus, 9.29% Muslims, 3.6% Christians, 0.01% Sikhs, 0.01% Buddhists, 0.0% Jains, 0.12% following other religions and 0.03% following no religion or did not indicate any religious preference.

Politics
Perambalur (state assembly constituency) is reserved for scheduled castes. And current MLA is Prabhakaran from DMK, elected in the 2021 Tamil Nadu Legislative Assembly election.

The current Member of Parliament for Perambalur Constituency is T. R. Paarivendhar.

Landmarks
There are a set of 11th century Buddha statues around the villages of Perambalur called Perambalur Buddhas.

See also

 List of educational institutions in Perambalur

References

External links

 Perambalur municipality

Cities and towns in Perambalur district